Alberada bidentella is a species of snout moth in the genus Alberada. It was described by Harrison Gray Dyar Jr. in 1908, and is known from the south-western United States from Texas westward.

The wingspan is 20–24 mm for males and 19–23 mm for females. Adults are uniformly marked and colored.

The larvae feed within the stem of Cylindropuntia species.

References

Moths described in 1908
Phycitini
Moths of North America